Panopea dockensis is an extinct species of marine bivalve mollusc from the Pliocene–Pleistocene Waccamaw Formation of North Carolina. It was a close relative of the well-known Pacific geoduck. It gets its name from the locality of Old Dock in Columbus County, where it was first discovered.

References

Hiatellidae